Kryuki is a rural locality (a village) in Nagornoye Rural Settlement, Petushinsky District, Vladimir Oblast, Russia. The population was 4 as of 2010.

Geography 
Kryuki is located 43 km northwest of Petushki (the district's administrative centre) by road. Novoye Stenino is the nearest rural locality.

References 

Rural localities in Petushinsky District